Desmoulins, de Moulins, des Moulins or Demoulin may refer to:
Georges Demoulin (1919–1994), Belgian entomologist
Michel Demoulin (born 1965), Belgian athlete
Nicolas Démoulin (born 1972), French politician
Robert Demoulin (1911–2008), Belgian academic
Jacques Démoulin (1905-1991), French painter
Jean de Moulins (d. 1353), French cardinal
Roger de Moulins (d. 1187), Grand Master of the Knights Hospitaller
André Desmoulins (fl. 1940), French cyclist
Camille Desmoulins (1760–1794), French revolutionary leader
Lucile Desmoulins née Duplessis (1770–1794), wife of Camille
Charles Des Moulins (1798–1875), French naturalist
Guyart des Moulins (1251–1322), French monk

French-language surnames